In mathematics, it can be shown that every function can be written as the composite of a surjective function followed by an injective function. Factorization systems are a generalization of this situation in category theory.

Definition

A factorization system (E, M) for a category C consists of two classes of morphisms E and M of C such that:
E and M both contain all isomorphisms of C and are closed under composition.

Orthogonality 

commutes. This notion can be extended to define the orthogonals of sets of morphisms by

 and 

Since in a factorization system  contains all the isomorphisms, the condition (3) of the definition is equivalent to
(3')  and 

Equivalent definition 
The pair  of classes of morphisms of C is a factorization system if and only if it satisfies the following conditions:

 and

Weak factorization systems 
Suppose e and m are two morphisms in a category C. Then e has the left lifting property with respect to m (respectively m has the right lifting property with respect to e) when for every pair of morphisms u and v such that ve = mu there is a morphism w such that the following diagram commutes. The difference with orthogonality is that w is not necessarily unique.

A weak factorization system (E, M) for a category C consists of two classes of morphisms E and M of C such that:
The class E is exactly the class of morphisms having the left lifting property with respect to each morphism in M.
The class M is exactly the class of morphisms having the right lifting property with respect to each morphism in E.
This notion leads to a succinct definition of model categories: a model category is a pair consisting of a category C and classes of (so-called) weak equivalences W, fibrations F and cofibrations C so that

 C  has all limits and colimits,

  is a weak factorization system, and

  is a weak factorization system.

A model category is a complete and cocomplete category equipped with a model structure.

References

External links

 

Category theory